The 1Munti Emeralds are a professional basketball team based in Muntinlupa, Philippines. The team competes in the Maharlika Pilipinas Basketball League (MPBL), the Pilipinas Super League, and formerly competed in the Filbasket. The team plays its home games at the Muntinlupa Sports Center.

The team goes by the Muntinlupa Cagers in the Maharlika Pilipinas Basketball League.

History
On January 27, 2018, the Muntinlupa Cagers won their first game against the Navotas Clutch in the inaugural season of the Maharlika Pilipinas Basketball League.

Current roster

All-time players 

 Gian Abrigo (2018–present)
 Felix Apreku (2018–present)
 Egay Billiones (2018)
 Kevin Buenaflor (2018)
 John Paul Cauilan (2018–present)
 Danny Diocampo (2018)
 Jerick Fabian (2018)
 Bernzon Franco (2018)
 Kaizer Galvez (2018)
 Senator Bong Go (2018–2019)
 Rey Guevarra (2018)
 Chito Jaime (2018–2019)
 Chris Lalata (2018)
 Pari Llagas (2018–present)
 Allan Mangahas (2018–present)
 Dave Moralde (2018–present)
 Dhon Reverente (2018–present)
 Juan Salaveria (2018)
 Chester Saldua (2018–present)
 Christopher Sison (2018)
 Andretti Stevens (2018)
 Al Vergara (2018)
 GJ Ylagan (2018)
 Kano Landrito (2018)

Season-by-season records
Records from the 2022 MPBL season:

References

2018 establishments in the Philippines
Basketball teams established in 2018
Maharlika Pilipinas Basketball League teams
Sports teams in Metro Manila